Daniel Garrido Peña (born 19 January 2000) is a Spanish professional footballer who plays as a central midfielder for Real Sociedad B.

Club career
Born in Logroño, La Rioja, Garrido joined Real Sociedad's youth setup in 2012, from Valvanera CD. He made his senior debut with the C-team on 25 August 2018 by starting in a 2–0 Tercera División away win against SD San Pedro, and scored his first goals on 20 October after netting a brace in a 3–3 home draw against JD Somorrostro.

Garrido was promoted to the reserves ahead of the 2019–20 season, and featured regularly as his side returned to Segunda División after 59 years in 2021. He made his professional debut on 14 August 2021, starting in a 1–0 home win over CD Leganés.

References

External links

2000 births
Living people
Sportspeople from Logroño
Spanish footballers
Footballers from La Rioja (Spain)
Association football midfielders
Segunda División players
Segunda División B players
Tercera División players
Real Sociedad C footballers
Real Sociedad B footballers